Ink brushes are paintbrushes used in Chinese calligraphy as well as in Japanese,  Korean, and Vietnamese which both have roots in Chinese calligraphy. They are also used in Chinese painting and other brush painting styles. The ink brush was invented in China around 300 B.C. Together with the inkstone, inkstick and Xuan paper, these four writing implements form the Four Treasures of the Study.

Types

Brushes differ greatly in terms of size, texture, material, and cost. The brush hair chosen depends on one's needs at the moment; certain kinds of brushes are more suited to certain script styles and individuals than others. 
 Handle: usually of bamboo, exotic brushes may instead use such materials as gold, silver, jade, ivory, red sandalwood or spotted bamboo.
 Hair source: normally the brush is made from goat, Siberian weasel (yellow-rat-wolf), pig, mouse, buffalo, wolf, or rabbit hair, while exotic ones can be made from tiger, fowl, deer, and even human hair (from a baby's first haircut, said to bring good fortune while taking the imperial examinations).
 Hair texture: soft, mixed, or hard hair.
The smallest brushes are used for very small pieces and for fashioning designs for seals. While medium size brushes are the most widely used, wielded by a skilled artist a medium brush can produce a variety of thicknesses of line from very thin to fairly thick. The largest brushes are used only for very large pieces.
Hair length: generally classified by hair length for thickness of handle as either long, medium, short; most calligraphy is written with a medium-length hair brush. The long hair brush are more keep to hold an ink than the short hair brushes as their length. So, it used for continuous long or short stroke line scripting such as Japanese traditional hiragana style by renmen. The hair of long hair brushes tend to be made by hard texture hair to keep their hair form, but there is a not one. Japanese very long and slender hair brushes called menso-burushes are used for detail painting.

Synthetic hair is not traditionally used. Prices vary greatly depending on the quality of the brush; cheap brushes cost less than one US dollar while expensive brushes can cost more than a thousand dollars. Currently, the finest brushes are made in the town of Shanlian, in the Nanxun District, prefecture-level city of Huzhou, of Zhejiang province.

History

The earliest intact ink brush was found in 1954 in the tomb of a Chu citizen from the Warring States period (475-221 BCE) located in an archaeological dig site Zuo Gong Shan 15 near Changsha (長沙). The early version of an ink brush found had a wooden stalk and a bamboo tube securing the bundle of hair to the stalk. Legend wrongly credits the invention of the ink brush to the later Qin general Meng Tian.

Traces of the writing brush, however, were discovered on the Shang jades, and were suggested to be the grounds of the oracle bone inscriptions.

The writing brush entered a new stage of development in the Han dynasty. First, it created the decoration craft of engraving and inlaying on the pen-holder. Second, some writings on the production of writing brush appeared. For example, the first monograph on the selection, production and function of writing brush was written by Cai Yong in the eastern Han dynasty . Third, the special form of "hairpin white pen" appeared. Officials in the Han dynasty often sharpened the end of the brush and stuck it in their hair or hat for their convenience. Worshipers also often put pen on their heads to show respect.

To The Yuan and Ming dynasty, Huzhou emerged a group of pen making experts to make it more convenient, such as Wu Yunhui, Feng Yingke, Lu Wenbao, Zhang Tianxi, etc. Huzhou has been the center of Chinese brush making since the Qing dynasty. At the same time, there was many famous brushes in other places, such as Ruyang Liu brush in Henan province, Li Dinghe brush in Shanghai, Wu Yunhui in Jiangxi province.

Fudepen

The Fudepen, also known as a "Brush Pen", is a modern Japanese invention analogous to a Fountain pen. Today, Japanese companies such as Pentel and Sakura Color Products Corporation manufacture pens with tips resembling those of a small ink brush. These brush pens work almost identically to small ink brushes and can be used for most of the same purposes.

See also
 Chinese calligraphy
 Huzhou ink brush
Xuan writing brush
 Japanese calligraphy
 Korean calligraphy

References

Chinese calligraphy
Chinese inventions
East Asian calligraphy
Painting materials
Writing implements